Zenzinger is a surname. Notable people with the surname include:

Rachel Zenzinger, American politician
Roman Zenzinger (1903–1990), Austrian artist and commercial designer